Archips ingentanus is a species of moth of the family Tortricidae. It is found in China (Heilongjiang), Korea, Japan and Russia (Ussuri, Amur, Sakhalin, Primorye, Kuril Islands).

The wingspan is 19–26 mm for males and 25–34 mm for females.

The larvae feed on Abies firma, Abies nephrolepis, Camellia, Malus pumila, Pyrus, Quercus, Artemisia lavandulaefolia, Ipomoea aquatica, Petasites, Urtica, Plantago asiatica and Lilium species.

References

Moths described in 1881
Archips
Moths of Asia